Justin Feser (born July 29, 1992) is a Canadian professional ice hockey forward. He is currently playing with ERC Ingolstadt in the Deutsche Eishockey Liga (DEL).

Playing career
Feser played his entire five year junior hockey career with the Tri-City Americans of the Western Hockey League. After his junior hockey career concluded with the Tri-City Americans of the WHL he then signed an Amateur try-out deal with the Portland Pirates in the American Hockey League (AHL). He appeared in six games with the Pirates and in the off-season signed a contract with EHC Olten of the National League B (NLB) in Switzerland.

Feser was rewarded for his outstanding performance during the 2012–13 WHL season by being named to the 2013 WHL West First All-Star Team as well as being named the Western Conference finalist for the Four Broncos Memorial Trophy for WHL player of the year. During the same season Justin broke a 21-year-old WHL record for the most consecutive games played (312) and captured the WHL's All-time Iron Man record.

In 2013, Feser took his game to Switzerland joining EHC Olten, where he played until the conclusion of the 2016–17 season. Following his four-year stint with the National League B side, he headed to Germany, signing with Deutsche Eishockey Liga club Krefeld Pinguine in June 2017. Feser spent the duration of the 2017–18 season with Krefeld, posting 14 goals in 44 games.

On April 23, 2018, having concluded his contract with Krefeld, Feser left to sign a one-year deal with rival DEL club, Fischtown Pinguins.

Feser played two seasons with Fischtown before leaving at the conclusion of his contract to sign a one-year deal with his third DEL outfit, ERC Ingolstadt, on March 19, 2020.

Career statistics

Regular season and playoffs

International

Awards and honours

References

External links 

1992 births
Living people
Canadian ice hockey left wingers
Fischtown Pinguins players
Ice hockey people from Alberta
ERC Ingolstadt players
Krefeld Pinguine players
EHC Olten players
Portland Pirates players
Sportspeople from Red Deer, Alberta
Tri-City Americans players
Canadian expatriate ice hockey players in Germany
Canadian expatriate ice hockey players in Switzerland